Cornelis Pieter "Cees" Geel (born 13 March 1965 in Schagen) is a Dutch television, radio and film actor. His notable credits include in the TV miniseries Anne Frank: The Whole Story (2001) and in the film Simon (2004). He won the Golden Calf for Best Actor award for his role in Simon.

Filmography
Anne Frank: The Whole Story (2001; TV) as Willem Van Maaren
Schiet mij maar lek (2002; TV series) as Karel
Simon (2004) as Simon Cohen
06/05 (2004) as Politie-agent
Medea (2005)
Too Fat Too Furious (2005) as Lars Meuleman
Deuce Bigalow: European Gigolo (2005) as Man-Whore Union Doorman
Samen (TV series; 2005–06) as Rogier Kuipers
Het Woeden der Gehele Wereld (2006) as Joost Vroom
Spoorloos verdwenen (2006; TV series episode "De verdwenen actrice") as Snaker 
Gooische vrouwen  (2006; TV series episode "Regiseur") as Regiseur
Adriaan (2007) as Vader Adriaan
Van Speijk (2007; 3 episodes as Det. Koos Zwart) 
De Scheepsjongens van Bontekoe (2007) as Koopman
Sextet (2007) as Wim
Clean Hands (2015)

External links

1965 births
Living people
Dutch male actors
Dutch male film actors
Dutch male radio actors
Dutch male television actors
Golden Calf winners
People from Schagen